The Sixth Wisconsin Legislature convened from January 12, 1853, to April 4, 1853, in regular session.  They reconvened from June 6 to July 13 to sit as a court of impeachment for Wisconsin Circuit Court Judge Levi Hubbell.

This was the first legislative session after the expansion and redistricting of the Senate and Assembly.  The Senate grew from 19 to 25 seats; he Assembly grew from 66 to 82 seats.

Senators representing odd-numbered districts were newly elected for this session and were serving the first year of a two-year term.  Assemblymembers were elected to a one-year term.  Assemblymembers and odd-numbered senators were elected in the general election of November 2, 1852.  Senators representing even-numbered districts were serving the second year of their two-year term, having been elected in the general election held on November 4, 1851, or were elected in the 1852 election for a newly created district and were serving a one-year term.

Major events
 March 4, 1853: Inauguration of Franklin Pierce as the 14th President of the United States.
 March 5, 1853: Wisconsin State Assembly voted to impeach Wisconsin Circuit Court Judge Levi Hubbell.
 July 11, 1853: Judge Levi Hubbell was acquitted in a trial of impeachment in the Wisconsin State Senate.
 September 21, 1853: Lieutenant Governor Timothy Burns died in office.
 November 8, 1853: William A. Barstow elected Governor of Wisconsin.

Major legislation

 February 11, 1853: Act to divide the County of La Crosse and create the County of Jackson, 1853 Act 8
 February 16, 1853: Act to incorporate the County of Shawanaw, 1853 Act 9
 March 4, 1853: Act to incorporate the State Historical Society of Wisconsin, 1853 Act 17
 March 7, 1853: Act for the division of the county of Washington, and the creation of the county of Ozaukee, 1853 Act 21
 March 14, 1853: Act to divide Saint Croix, and create the counties of Pierce and Polk, 1853 Act 31
 March 19, 1853: Act to organize a Seventh Judicial Circuit, and to provide for the election of a Judge thereof, 1853 Act 40
 March 19, 1853: Act to provide for contesting elections of members of the Senate and Assembly, 1853 Act 41
 March 25, 1853: Act providing for the Geological Survey of the State, 1853 Act 47
 April 2, 1853: Act providing for the organization of Joint Stock Companies, 1853 Act 68
 June 6, 1853: Act to amend article four of the Constitution, 1853 Act 95, to change state senate terms from two years to four years.  This act was eventually put to a referendum in 1854, where it was defeated by a 2-to-1 margin.
 July 6, 1853: Act to divide the county of Jackson, and create the counties of Buffalo and Clarke, 1853 Act 100
 July 6, 1853: Act to submit to the people the question of a Prohibitory Liquor Law, 1853 Act 101
 July 12, 1853: Act to provide for the punishment of murder in the first degree, and to abolish the penalty of death, 1853 Act 103. With this act, Wisconsin became the first U.S. state to abolish the death penalty.

Party summary

Senate summary

Assembly summary

Sessions
 1st Regular session: January 12, 1853 – April 4, 1853
 Special Impeachment session: June 6, 1853 – July 13, 1853

Leaders

Senate leadership
 President of the Senate: Timothy Burns, Lieutenant Governor (Until his death, September 21, 1853)
 President pro tempore: Duncan Reed

Assembly leadership
 Speaker of the Assembly: Henry L. Palmer

Members

Members of the Senate
Members of the Wisconsin Senate for the Sixth Wisconsin Legislature (25):

Members of the Assembly
Members of the Assembly for the Sixth Wisconsin Legislature (82):

Employees

Senate employees
 Chief Clerk: John K. Williams
 Sergeant-at-Arms: Thomas Hood

Assembly employees
 Chief Clerk: Thomas McHugh
 Sergeant-at-Arms: Richard F. Wilson

Changes from the 5th Legislature
The most significant structural change to the Legislature between the 5th and 6th sessions was the reapportionment and redistricting of legislative seats.  The new districts were defined in 1852 Wisconsin Act 499, passed into law in the 5th Wisconsin Legislature.

Senate redistricting

Summary of changes
 12 districts were simply renumbered without border adjustments.
 Waukesha County went from having one senator to two (9, 10).
 Rock County went from having one senator to two (17, 18).
 Washington County went from having one senator to two (3, 4)—the territory comprising the 3rd district became a separate county, Ozaukee, during the 6th Legislature.
 Columbia County became its own senate district (25), after previously having been in a shared district with Adams, Marathon, Marquette, Portage, Sauk, and Waushara.
 Fond du Lac and Winnebago counties became separate senate districts (20, 21), after previously having been in a shared district with Waupaca.
 Adams, Marquette, Sauk, and Waushara counties became a senate district (23).
 Calumet, Manitowoc, and Sheboygan counties became a senate district (1), separating from the previous vast multi-county northeast district.
 Brown, Door, Marathon, Oconto, Outagamie, Portage, and Waupaca counties constituted the new multi-county northeast district (2).

Senate districts

Assembly redistricting

Summary of changes
 Columbia County went from having 1 district to 2.
 Dane County went from having 3 districts to 5.
 Dodge County went from having 5 districts to 6.
 Fond du Lac County went from having 2 districts to 4.
 Grant County went from having 4 districts to 5.
 Iowa County went from having 1 district and 1 shared district with Richland to having 2 districts.
 Jefferson County went from having 3 districts to 5.
 Lafayette County went from having 2 districts to 3.
 Marquette and Waushara counties went from sharing 1 district to sharing 2 districts.
 Milwaukee County went from having 7 districts to 9.
 Racine County went from having 3 districts to 4.
 Richland County became its own assembly district, after previously having been in a shared district with Iowa County.
 Rock County went from having 5 districts to 4.
 Walworth County went from having 5 districts to 6.
 Washington County went from having 5 districts to 4—the eastern 2 districts became Ozaukee County during the 6th Legislature.
 Waukesha County went from having 5 districts to 4.

Assembly districts

References

External links

1853 in Wisconsin
Wisconsin
Wisconsin legislative sessions